Serra da Capivara Airport  is the airport serving São Raimundo Nonato, Brazil. It is named after Serra da Capivara National Park. 
 
It is operated by Esaero.

History
The airport was commissioned on 27 October 2015.

Airlines and destinations

Access

See also

List of airports in Brazil

References

External links

Airports in Piauí